Rysen John (born December 20, 1997) is a Canadian gridiron football wide receiver for the Calgary Stampeders of the Canadian Football League (CFL).

University career
John played college football as a wide receiver for the Simon Fraser Clan from 2016 to 2019. In his senior college season, John was selected to play in the 2020 Hula Bowl.

Professional career
John was drafted in the third round, 21st overall, by the Calgary Stampeders in the 2020 CFL Draft and was not drafted in the 2020 NFL Draft.

New York Giants
John was signed by the New York Giants as an undrafted free agent following the 2020 NFL Draft on April 30, 2020. He was waived/injured on September 2, 2020, and reverted to the team's injured reserve list the next day. He was waived with an injury settlement on September 6, 2020. He signed to the team's practice squad on October 27, 2020. He signed a reserve/future contract on January 4, 2021. He was placed on injured reserve on August 24, 2021.  
He was waived on May 10, 2022.

Chicago Bears
On May 11, 2022, the Chicago Bears claimed John off the waivers. He was released on August 16, 2022.

Calgary Stampeders
On February 20, 2023, it was announced that John had signed with the Calgary Stampeders.

References

External links
Calgary Stampeders bio

1997 births
Living people
American football tight ends
American football wide receivers
Black Canadian players of American football
Gridiron football people from British Columbia
Chicago Bears players
New York Giants players
Simon Fraser Clan football players
Sportspeople from Vancouver